Specchiolla is an Italian resort on the Adriatic sea. It is a "frazione" of the city of Carovigno and near the city of San Vito dei Normanni, located it the southern part of the region of Apulia, in the province of Brindisi.

Geography
Specchiolla is located on the Salento peninsula, on the Adriatic coast.

Its distances from its surrounding cities are:
 9 km from San Vito dei Normanni,
10 km from Carovigno,
17 km from San Michele Salentino,
18 km from Ostuni,
20 km from Brindisi.

History
In the past, Specchiolla belonged to the city of San Vito dei Normanni. Because the local nobility was known to engage in gambling activities, legend narrates that the Prince of San Vito dei Normanni lost Specchiolla in a wager with his cousin, Prince of the neighboring city of Carovigno. Because Sanvitesi are the most numerous vacationers in Specchiolla, they reproach their rival neighbors of Carovigno for their insufficient attention to the conservation of this resort.

Province of Brindisi